Benjamin Michael Lee (born 11 September 1978) is an Australian musician and actor. Lee began his career as a musician at the age of 14 with the Sydney band Noise Addict, but he focused on his solo career when the band broke up in 1995. He appeared as the protagonist in the Australian film The Rage in Placid Lake (2003). He has released eleven solo studio albums. Rolling Stone Australia said of his latest album, I'm Fun!: "Self-described troublemaker Ben Lee is releasing one of the best albums of his career".

Career

Noise Addict
Lee's musical career began in 1993 with the band Noise Addict, who were signed to Steve Pavlovic's independent label Fellaheen Records, on the strength of a self-produced and distributed four-track demo recorded in Lee's bedroom. Pavlovic's connections brought the band to the attention of Sonic Youth's Thurston Moore and Beastie Boys' Mike D, both of whom released the band's material in the US. The group put out several releases on the Beasties' Grand Royal Records.

These including the acoustic Young and Jaded EP in 1994, which contained Lee's Evan Dando tribute, "I Wish I Was Him". In 1995, Grand Royal released the band's only full-length album, the Brad Wood–produced Meet the Real You. Noise Addict made a music video for the song "16", toured with Sebadoh, but then broke up. Lee was also briefly a member of the alternative act Gerling. In 2009, Lee recorded a new Noise Addict album, It Was Never About the Audience, with a new lineup: Lou Barlow and Lara Meyerratken.

Solo career
Lee's solo career started at the age of 16, while he was still in Noise Addict. He began recording his first solo album, Grandpaw Would, in both Sydney and Chicago with producer Brad Wood. This was followed by the 1997 album, Something to Remember Me By, also produced by Wood. An alternate version of his song "Burn to Shine", produced by T-Bone Burnett, played over the end credits of the film Best Men. Lee was then featured on the There's Something About Mary soundtrack, with the song "How to Survive a Broken Heart". 1998's Breathing Tornados, released on Pavlovic's new label Modular, marked a new direction for Lee as he introduced synthesisers and increased instrumentation into his sound.

The album was a success in Australia, earning Lee ARIA Award nominations for Best Male Artist and Album of the Year. The album's first single, "Cigarettes Will Kill You", was also nominated for Single of the Year and finished second in that year's Triple J Hottest 100. In 2001, Lee contributed a track ("Sweet Is the Night") to a Jeff Lynne tribute album Lynne Me Your Ears.

Lee's fourth album, hey you. yes you., was released in 2002. The first single from the album, "Something Borrowed, Something Blue", reached number 67 on the ARIA Charts and number 22 on the 2002's Triple J Hottest 100. The second single, "Running with Scissors", peaked at number 82 on the ARIA charts. In 2003, he also contributed several songs to the Evan Dando solo album Baby I'm Bored.

In late 2004, Lee left Steve Pavlovic's Modular Recordings and started his own record label, Ten Fingers. The first release on the label was the single, "Gamble Everything for Love", followed by the album, Awake Is the New Sleep in February 2005, which went double platinum in Australia. A defining release in his career, the album showcased a much brighter, positive side of Lee's personality, in contrast to his previous darker musings. Awake Is the New Sleep received several nominations for the 2005 Australian Recording Industry Association (ARIA) awards, and Lee won Best Male Artist, Best Independent Release, and Single of the Year for "Catch My Disease", which Lee wrote with Mcgowan Southworth. "Catch My Disease" also went to No. 2 on the 2005 Triple J Hottest 100.

In addition, the song was featured on the soundtracks to the 2005 films Just Friends and Deuce Bigalow: European Gigolo, as well as the soundtracks to the television series, Grey's Anatomy, Hidden Palms and Scrubs. In 2006 it was used in a television commercial for Dell Computers. On 26 March 2006, Lee performed "We're All in This Together" from Awake Is the New Sleep at the closing ceremony of the 2006 Commonwealth Games. The single for "We're All in This Together" was released on 8 April 2006. The CD includes cover versions of the song by Pony Up, Holidays on Ice and Gelbison. "We're All in This Together" is being used in commercials for Kohl's (2008), Coca-Cola (Remixed Australian Summer Series Ads in 2007), the South Australian Government (2006), the Salvation Army Red Shield Appeal (2007) and Telus Mobility's "My Faves" (2007).

Lee released his sixth album, Ripe, on 18 September 2007 with Benji Madden and Mandy Moore making appearances. Mandy Moore sung a light-hearted, '50s style duet with Lee called "Birds and Bees". "Mandy was very sweet and did her best Olivia Newton-John for me. I'm really psyched about this recording," Lee says. Madden helped out with some backing vocals, along with US band Rooney and Sara Watkins from the band Nickel Creek. "American Television" from the album was used in a VH1 advertisement for Flavor of Love 3 and the song "Ripe" appeared in an episode of One Tree Hill (Season 5, episode 2).

In 2007, Lee performed a cover of Crosby, Stills & Nash's "Our House" for Landmarks on The DL.

In February 2009, Lee released his seventh studio album, The Rebirth of Venus, which received mixed reviews. It featured guest performances from the likes of Missy Higgins and Patience Hodgson, and peaked at No.21 on the ARIA Charts.

Lee's eighth studio album, Deeper into Dream, was released on 11 October 2011. It was Lee's first attempt at a concept album, basing the entire 12 tracks around the dream state. Despite not charting, it was received fairly favourably by critics.

In April 2013, Lee released his ninth and arguably his most experimental studio album entitled Ayahuasca: Welcome to the Work, with collaboration from Jessica Chapnik. The album is based upon his personal experience with the psychoactive South American drug known as Ayahuasca. Lee featured as the mentor for Joel Madden's team on the 2013 season of The Voice Australia.

In June 2015, Lee released his 10th solo album, Love Is the Great Rebellion, his first on a major label, Warner Bros. Records.

According to Radio National's Geoff Wood, Lee invented the term "electro-yoga" to describe a new form of music dedicated to the practice of yoga. Lee has since followed up this release with an acoustically-oriented album, entitled Freedom, Love and The Recuperation of the Human Mind, in 2016; as well as a children's album, called Ben Lee Sings Songs About Islam for the Whole Family, in 2017. Together with former How I Met Your Mother star Josh Radnor, Lee formed an indie-folk duo called Radnor and Lee, and released their debut self-titled album in November 2017.

2018 saw the release of B Is for Beer, a soundtrack to the musical based on the novel of the same name written by Tom Robbins. Lee and Robbins had collaborated for ten years to develop the musical. Funding for the album's development came via crowd-sourcing at Kickstarter.

Lee released Quarter Century Classix in 2019, a collection of cover songs he was influenced by during his teenage years. In 2020, Radnor and Lee released their second collaborative album, Golden State.

In 2021, Lee competed in the third season of the Australian version of The Masked Singer as "Professor". He finished tenth after being eliminated in the third episode.

In September 2021, The Music Network confirmed Lee had signed with Warner Music Australia, who will release I'M FUN! in June 2022, preceded by single "Born for This Bullshit". The deal includes rights to his 19-album back catalogue.

Personal life
Lee was born in Sydney and was raised in a Jewish household, but did not consider himself religious as a child. Lee was educated at Moriah College located in Sydney's eastern suburbs.

Lee dated Claire Danes for several years, but their relationship ended in 2003. He married actress Ione Skye on 28 December 2008, in a Hindu wedding ceremony in India. They have one child.

Lee stated that he follows a pescatarian diet.

Discography

Studio albums

Collaboration albums

Soundtrack albums

Mixtapes

Extended plays

Singles

Notes:
A  The Australian peak for the "Into the Dark" EP is on the ARIA albums chart.

Promotional singles

Other appearances
 "Itchycoo Park" from I Shot Andy Warhol (1996)
 "Make Your Move" (featuring Ione Skye) from Spider (2007)
 "Beautiful Flirt" (with Ione Skye and Jack Graddis) from Bear (2011)
 "We're All in This Together" (with Jack River and Lime Cordiale) from Music from the Home Front (2020)

Awards and nominations

AIR Awards
The Australian Independent Record Awards (commonly known informally as AIR Awards) is an annual awards night to recognise, promote and celebrate the success of Australia's Independent Music sector.

! 
|-
| rowspan="2" | 2006
|Awake Is the New Sleep  
| Best Performing Independent Album
| 
| rowspan="2" |
|-
| Ben Lee
| Independent Artist of the Year
| 
|-

ARIA Music Awards
The ARIA Music Awards is an annual awards ceremony that recognises excellence, innovation, and achievement across all genres of Australian music. They commenced in 1987. Lee has won four awards.

! 
|-
| rowspan="3"| 1999
| rowspan="2"|  Breathing Tornados
| ARIA Award for Album of the Year
| 
| rowspan="3"| 
|-
| ARIA Award for Best Male Artist
| 
|-
| "Cigarettes Will Kill You"
| ARIA Award for Single of the Year
| 
|-
| 2003
| hey you. yes you.
| Best Male Artist
| 
| 
|-
| rowspan="6"| 2005
| "Catch My Disease"
| Single of the Year
| 
| rowspan="6"| 
|-
| rowspan="4"| Awake Is the New Sleep
| Best Male Artist
| 
|-
| ARIA Award for Best Independent Release
| 
|-
| Album of the Year
| 
|-
| ARIA Award for Best Pop Release
| 
|-
| Awake Is the New Sleep (Ben Lee, Lara Meyerratken, Dan Estabrook )
| ARIA Award for Best Cover Art
| 
|-
| rowspan="3"| 2006
| rowspan="2"| Awake Is the New Sleep
| Best Male Artist
| 
| rowspan="3"| 
|-
| Best Independent Release
| 
|-
| Into the Dark
| ARIA Award for Best Pop Release
|  
|-
| rowspan="2"| 2008
| Ripe
| Best Independent Release
| 
| 
|-
| The Square (with Jessica Chapnik)
| Best Original Soundtrack, Cast or Show Album
| 
| 
|-

APRA Awards
The APRA Awards are held in Australia and New Zealand by the Australasian Performing Right Association to recognise songwriting skills, sales and airplay performance by its members annually. 

! 
|-
| rowspan="2"| 2006
| rowspan="2"| "Catch My Disease"
| Song of the Year
| 
| 
|-
| Most Performed Australian Work 
| 
| 
|-

Australian Music Prize
The Australian Music Prize (the AMP) is an annual award of $30,000 given to an Australian band or solo artist in recognition of the merit of an album released during the year of award. They commenced in 2005.

! 
|-
| 2005
|Awake Is the New Sleep
| Australian Music Prize
| 
| 
|-

References

External links

Artist page on Dangerbird Records
 

1978 births
Living people
APRA Award winners
ARIA Award winners
Australian child singers
Australian indie pop musicians
Australian indie rock musicians
Australian Jews
Australian male film actors
Australian pop singers
Australian singer-songwriters
Jewish Australian male actors
Jewish Australian musicians
Lojinx artists
Dew Process artists
Male actors from Sydney
New West Records artists
21st-century Australian male actors
People educated at Moriah College
21st-century Australian singers
21st-century Australian male singers
The Bens members
Gerling members
Noise Addict members
Radnor and Lee members
Australian male singer-songwriters
Dangerbird Records artists
Modular Recordings artists